Based Boys is the debut album by Bay Area rap group The Pack. The album was released on October 30, 2007, by Jive Records.

Music videos 
The first video was shot for "In My Car" in Los Angeles by famed director Dale "Rage" Resteghini. The second video was shot on December 13, 2007, in New York for "I Look Good".

Other videos off the album include music videos shot for "Vans" and "I'm Shinin'" shot previously to help promote Skateboards 2 Scrapers EP. A low budget music video was also shot for "Booty Bounce Bopper".

Sales 
Even though their first EP Skateboards 2 Scrapers received fairly good sale reception, their debut album Based Boys failed to do so. The album sold a disappointing 2,300 copies in its first week according to Soundscan and Billboard. The album peaked at #14 on Billboard's Heatseeker chart.

Track listing

References 

2007 debut albums
The Pack (group) albums
Albums produced by Mr. Collipark